The 1987–88 Yugoslav First Basketball League season was the 44th season of the Yugoslav First Basketball League, the highest professional basketball league in SFR Yugoslavia.

Regular season

Classification

Playoff 
Only the top four placed league table teams qualified for the playoffs quarterfinal automatically.

Teams placed fifth, sixth, seventh, eighth, ninth, and tenth were joined by the top two Second League teams for an 8-team play-in round. The winner of each best-of-three series advanced to the playoffs quarterfinal round.

Finals
Top-seeded Jugoplastika reached the playoff finals dominantly, rampaging though the league with a 21-1 regular season record followed by two confident playoff sweeps.

On the other hand, despite being the defending champions, third seed KK Partizan returned to the playoff finals somewhat unexpectedly, having to overcome second seed KK Cibona's home-court advantage in their semifinal series by improbably defeating the Zagreb team away in deciding game three, 77-83, with Cibona's superstar Dražen Petrović held to only 13 points while Partizan's best player, young center Vlade Divac, scored 23 points.

Game 1: Jugoplastika vs. Partizan 101-79
Twenty-year-old Divac would also become the main story of the finals' opening game despite being absent from it due to picking up a knee injury under never fully explained circumstances. It would later come out that his injury likely occurred jumping out of a hotel window while leaving, without permission, the pre-finals team quarantine to meet with his girlfriend. As a result of missing their best player, Partizan struggled mightily in game one away in Split, getting blown out by 22 points, 101-79, with Jugoplastika's young center Dino Rađa scoring 23 points, Željko Poljak adding 16, and young Toni Kukoč scoring 15. On the other hand, hapless Partizan's best contribution was from their young point guard Saša Đorđević who scored 22 points.

Game 2: Partizan vs. Jugoplastika 86-80
Seeing that they have no chance without Divac's inside presence, Partizan hustled their injured young center back on the court. Playing on one leg with a heavily bandaged knee, Divac still led the game two scoring with 18 points as Partizan pulled out an 86-80 victory at home. It was only Jugoplastika's second loss of the entire season.

Game 3: Jugoplastika vs. Partizan 88-67
Still-injured Divac appeared in the deciding game three back in Split but was no match for the rampant home team looking for their first league title since 1977. Jugoplastika won the game easily, claiming the league title.

The winning roster of Jugoplastika:
  Zoran Sretenović
  Velimir Perasović
  Vladan Alanović
  Toni Kukoč
  
  Željko Poljak
  Ivica Burić
  Žan Tabak
  Duško Ivanović
  Dino Rađa
  Petar Vučica
  Paško Tomić
  Teo Čizmić
  Leon Stipaničev
  Alen Koludrović

Coach:  Božidar Maljković

Scoring leaders
Dražen Petrović (Cibona) - ___ points (38.0ppg)
 (IMT) - __ points (30.1 ppg)

Qualification in 1988-89 season European competitions 

FIBA European Champions Cup
 Jugoplastika (champions)

FIBA Cup Winners' Cup
 Cibona (Cup winners)

FIBA Korać Cup
 Partizan (3rd)
 Smelt Olimpija (4th)
 Zadar (5th)
 Crvena Zvezda (6th)

References

Yugoslav First Basketball League seasons
 
Yugoslav